Gogera , is a town and union council of Okara District in the Punjab province of Pakistan.

History
Gogera was head of this region during the rebellion of 1857.it remained administrative head until the capital was shifted to Montgomery (now Sahiwal District). Lord Burkley's grave is at Gogera who was the commissioner of Gogera and was killed in battle with Rai Ahmad Khan Kharal after mutiny.

See also
Gugera Branch Canal
Rai Ahmad Khan Kharal
Chak (village) GB Gugera Branch Canal

References

Union councils of Okara District